Prior Cliff is a cliff between 1000 m and 1200 m extending east north east from Mount Dick, Churchill Mountains. Named in honor of Stuart Prior, a senior public servant with the Ministry of Foreign Affairs and Trade with previous involvement in Antarctic Treaty administration, who led New Zealand's Antarctic Policy Unit for several years and has actively worked against illegal sub-Antarctic fishing.

Cliffs of Oates Land

zh:普賴爾崖